Winnie-the-Pooh Pays a Visit is a 1971 animated film by Soyuzmultfilm directed by Fyodor Khitruk. The film is based on chapter two in the book series by A. A. Milne. It is the second part of a trilogy, following Winnie-the-Pooh (1969) and preceding Winnie-the-Pooh and a Busy Day (1972).

Storyline
The second part closely follows the first one: it is co-written by Khitruk and Boris Zakhoder and is based on the Pooh's love for honey; its prototype drawings are two dimensional and are created by Khitruk and Vladimir Zuikov. A new character (Rabbit) is added to the core cast of the first part: Winnie-the-Pooh, the narrator, and the Piglet.

Cast
 Vladimir Osenev as the narrator.
 Yevgeny Leonov as Winnie-the-Pooh. 
 Iya Savvina as Piglet. 
 Anatoly Shchukin as Rabbit.

Legacy and awards
In 1976 Khitruk was awarded the USSR State Prize for the Winnie-the-Pooh trilogy. The animation characters, as designed by Khitruk's team, are featured on the 1988 Soviet and 2012 Russian postal stamps; they are permanently painted on a public streetcar running through the Sokolniki Park, and their sculptures are installed in Ramenki District in Moscow.

When Khitruk visited the Disney Studios, Wolfgang Reitherman, the director of Winnie the Pooh and the Blustery Day, which won the 1968 Academy Award for Best Animated Short Film, told him that he liked the Soviet version better than his own.

References

External links

 
 Winnie the Pooh Goes Visiting at Animatsiya.net, where it can be watched with subtitles in various languages including English

Soyuzmultfilm
Soviet animated short films
1970s Russian-language films
Russian animated films
1971 films
1971 animated films
Winnie-the-Pooh featurettes
Films directed by Fyodor Khitruk
Animated featurettes